Khalia Braswell is an American computer scientist, educator, and technologist. She is the founder and executive director of INTech Camp for Girls, to encourage girls of color to pursue learning about technology.

Biography 
Khalia Braswell was born in Rocky Mount, North Carolina and moved to Charlotte in childhood. Braswell earned her Bachelor of Science degree in computer science at North Carolina State University and her Master of Science degree in Information Technology at the University of North Carolina at Charlotte.

In 2014, Braswell created INTech Camp for Girls, a program that aims to inspired girls of color to pursue careers in technology. Braswell moved to California after graduate school to work as an engineer at Apple. She resigned in 2018 and returned to Charlotte to run INTech full-time.

As of 2021, Braswell is pursuing a PhD in computer science education at Temple University in Philadelphia.

Awards 
Braswell received the Walker’s Legacy Women of Power award in 2018 and was included in The Root's 2018 list of 100 Most Influential African Americans.

See also 

 Alicia Nicki Washington
 Timnit Gebru
 Joy Buolamwini

References 

Living people
American women computer scientists
University of North Carolina alumni
American computer scientists
Year of birth missing (living people)
African-American computer scientists
21st-century African-American people
Temple University alumni
People from Rocky Mount, North Carolina
21st-century African-American women